Chris Oladokun (born September 3, 1997) is an American football quarterback for the Kansas City Chiefs of the National Football League (NFL). He played college football at South Florida before transferring to Samford then to South Dakota State.

Early life and high school
Oladokun was born and grew up in Tampa, Florida. He initially attended Braulio Alonso High School, where he was the starting quarterback as a sophomore and junior and passed for 3,646 yards and 32 touchdowns over those two seasons. Oladokun transferred to Sickles High School prior to his senior season. He was rated a three-star recruit and committed to play college football at South Florida over offers from Nebraska, Temple, Iowa State, Bowling Green, Georgia Southern, South Alabama, and Toledo.

College career
Oladokun began his college career at South Florida, and redshirted his true freshman season. He played in two games during his redshirt freshman season, completing one pass attempt for 12 yards and rushing once for one yard. Oladokun started three games as a redshirt sophomore and completed 22 of 44 pass attempts for 285 yards with three touchdowns and one interception. After the season, Oladokun announced that he would be transferring to  Samford. 

Oladokun played in all 12 of the Bulldogs' games and started eight in his first season with the team and passed for 2,064 yards and 18 touchdowns with seven interceptions and rushed for 493 yards and eight touchdowns. After his senior season, Oladokun transferred to South Dakota State as a graduate transfer. In his lone season with the Jackrabbits, he passed for 3,164 yards and 25 touchdowns.

Professional career

Pittsburgh Steelers
Oladokun was selected in the seventh round with the 241st overall pick of the 2022 NFL Draft by the Pittsburgh Steelers. He was released on August 23, 2022.

Kansas City Chiefs
On August 31, 2022, Oladokun was signed to the Kansas City Chiefs practice squad. Oladokun won Super Bowl LVII when the Chiefs defeated the Philadelphia Eagles. He signed a reserve/future contract on February 15, 2023.

References

External links
 Kansas City Chiefs bio
South Florida Bulls bio
Samford Bulldogs bio
South Dakota State Jackrabbits bio

1997 births
Living people
American sportspeople of Nigerian descent
Players of American football from Tampa, Florida
American football quarterbacks
South Florida Bulls football players
Samford Bulldogs football players
South Dakota State Jackrabbits football players
Pittsburgh Steelers players
Kansas City Chiefs players